The 2017–18 Rugby Europe Conference is the third-level rugby union competition below the premier Championship and Trophy competitions. It is the second Conference under its new format. After Czech Republic was promoted to the Trophy and Ukraine relegated at the end of the 2016–17 season, Andorra, Bosnia and Herzegovina, Croatia, Hungary, Israel, Latvia, Lithuania, Malta, Sweden and Ukraine compete for the Conference 1 title. While after the relegation of Turkey and the promotion of Slovakia, Austria, Cyprus, Denmark, Estonia, Finland, Luxembourg, Norway, Serbia, Slovenia and Slovakia will compete for the Conference 2 title.

The winners of Conference 1 North and South will play an additional match, a Conference 1-Trophy Promotion play-off for the right to play the 2018–19 Rugby Europe Trophy. While the bottom placed teams of Conference 1 North and South will be relegated to Conference 2 for the following season, replacing the North and South winners of Conference 2. The bottom placed team with the worse overall record will be relegated and participate in the 2019 Rugby Europe Development season.

The competition saw Alhambra Nievas and Joy Neville become the first and second women referees to take charge of men's fifteen–a–side internationals. On 14 October 2017 Nievas refereed the match between Finland and Norway. On 28 October 2017 Neville refereed the match between Norway and Denmark.

Conference 1

North

Table

Fixtures

South

Table

Fixtures

Conference 2

North

Table

Fixtures

Notes:
 The Finland v Norway match was notable for being the first time an all female list of referees were chosen to officiate a men's fifteen a side game.
 Originally a home game for Norway, but moved to Luxembourg due to recent cold weather conditions meaning the pitch could not recover in time.

South

Table

Fixtures

Conference 1 promotion to Trophy play-off

See also
 Rugby Europe International Championships
 2017–18 Rugby Europe International Championships
 Six Nations Championship

References

2017–18 Rugby Europe International Championships
2017-18